Sola Kosoko,  otherwise known as Sola Kosoko-Abina (born 7 January 1980), is a Nigerian film actress and film director known for Láròdá òjò. She is the daughter of Jide Kosoko. Sola kosoko starred in the movie Pala pala which also featured Yemi Solade and Muyiwa Kosoko. She addresses the Nigeria youth during the Media Literacy and Capacity Building program.

Education
Kosoko holds a bachelor's degree in Sociology from Olabisi Onabanjo University.

Career
Kosoko began her acting career professionally in 1999 where she featured in a movie titled Ola Abata produced by his father; Jide Kosoko. In 2001, she acted in the movie Omo Olorire which made her got popular. She has acted in several movies both in English and Yoruba since she started acting.

Personal life 
Sola Kosoko is one of the daughters of Jide Kosoko. She is married to Abiodun Abinna and they both have two daughters (Oluwasindara and Oluwasikemi) together.

Awards and nominations
City people award nominations

Selected filmography 
Ola Abata (1999)
Oko Irese (2000) 
Omo Olorire (2001)
Oko Irese
Omo Bishop (2005) 
Eje Adegbenro 2 (2006) 
Láròdá òjò (2008) 
Oloruka (2017)
Palace (2018)
Shadow Parties (2020)
Jemila
Valley Between
Roses and Thorns

References 

21st-century Nigerian actresses
Living people
Nigerian film actresses
Nigerian film directors
Nigerian women film directors
Olabisi Onabanjo University alumni
Actresses in Yoruba cinema
Yoruba actresses
20th-century Nigerian actresses
1980 births